Saiqa may refer to:
 Al-Saiqa (Libya), Libyan Special Forces
 As-Sa'iqa, a Palestinian Baathist political and military faction
 Saiqa (TV series), a Pakistani television drama series
 Saiqa (film) a 1968 Pakistani Urdu film
 Sa'ka Forces, Egyptian Special Forces
 Saiqa (actress), a Pakistani film actress